Oidaematophorus rogenhoferi is a moth of the family Pterophoridae that is found in Spain, France, Italy, Switzerland, Austria, Germany and Fennoscandia. It is also known from North America and the South Siberian Mountains.

Description
The left valve of the male genitalia is wider than the right. Both valves are rounded. Their saccular spine from the left is longer than in Oidaematophorus lithodactyla. The female has Ostium that is located over the axis of the antrum.

The larvae feed on bitter fleabane (Erigeron acer), alpine fleabane (Erigeron alpinus) and Erigeron glabratus.

Diet by country
In France, the species fly from July to August, where they also bred upon Erigeron acer angulosus. In Austria they feed on Erigeron alpinus, while in Norway they can't resist the taste of Erigeron acer politus.

References

External links
 Swedish Moths

Oidaematophorini
Moths described in 1871
Moths of North America
Moths of Asia
Plume moths of Europe
Taxa named by Josef Johann Mann